Air Development Squadron 3 or VX-3 was a United States Navy air test and evaluation squadron established on 20 November 1948 and disestablished on 1 March 1960.

Operational history

VX-3 was established by the merger of the assets of VA-1L and VF-1L and based at NAS Atlantic City, its aircraft carried the tail code "XC".

In late 1949 VX-3 received the F6U Pirate which it operated for a short period before sending them into storage at NAS Quonset Point.

In March 1953 VX-3 began operational trials of probe and drogue aerial refueling using AJ-1 Savage bombers.

In August 1955 VX-3 F9F-8s successfully tested the first mirror landing system aboard .

During testing of the Crusader two aircraft and pilots were lost.

Notable former members
Thomas J. Hudner Jr.
Donald D. Engen
Walter Starghill AT3

See also
History of the United States Navy
List of inactive United States Navy aircraft squadrons
List of United States Navy aircraft squadrons

References

Test squadrons of the United States Navy